Synaphea diabolica is a shrub endemic to Western Australia.

It is found on undulating areas in the Darling Range and  Wheatbelt region of Western Australia between Mundaring and Northam where it grows in gravelly soils over laterite.

References

Eudicots of Western Australia
diabolica
Endemic flora of Western Australia
Plants described in 2007